{|
{{Infobox ship image
|Ship image=[[Image:ORP Zbik and ORP Lwow.jpg|300px|ORP Żbik next to the training sailship Lwów]]
|Ship caption=ORP Żbik next to the training sailship Lwów
}}

|}
Her name means "wildcat" in Polish.Żbik'' was laid down in 1927 in Caen, launched in 1930, and entered service in 1932. When World War II began on 1 September 1939, she took part in the Worek Plan for the defense of the Polish coast. According to the plan she laid her mines, one of which sank a small (525 t) German minesweeper M85 on 1 October. After suffering battle damage and shortages of fuel, the submarine withdrew to neutral Swedish waters and was interned on 25 September. After the war, she returned to Poland in October 1945 and served in the navy of the Polish People's Republic until 1955. She was scrapped in 1956.

Commanders 
20.2.1932 - ?.12.1932 captain E. Plawski

?.12.1932 - ?.7.1938 captain H. Kloczkowski

?.7.1938 - 25.9.1939 lieutenant M. Zebrowski

External links
 Uboat.net on ORP Żbik

 

Wilk-class submarines
World War II submarines of Poland
1930 ships
Ships built in France